The 1955–56 Hapoel Ramat Gan season was the club's 30th season since its establishment in 1927, and 8th since the establishment of the State of Israel.

At the start of the season, the league which started during the previous season was completed, with the club finishing 10th. The new league season, with the top division being renamed Liga Leumit, began on 3 December 1955 and was completed on 3 June 1956, with the club finishing 9th.

During the season, the club also competed in the State Cup, which was also carried over the summer break. The club eliminated Maccabi Petah Tikva in the quarter finals, winning 1–0 in extra time, and losing at the semi-final to Hapoel Petah Tikva 0–2.

In addition, during the break between the completion of the 1954–55 league and the beginning of the 1955–56 league, the club participated in the Netanya 25th anniversary cup, along with Beitar Tel Aviv, Maccabi Petah Tikva and Hapoel Ramat Gan. In the competition, which was played as a round-robin tournament, the club finished second.

Match Results

Legend

1954–55 Liga Alef
The league began on 6 February 1955, and by the time the previous season ended, only 20 rounds of matches were completed, with the final 6 rounds being played during September and October 1955.

Final table

Matches

Results by match

1955–56 Liga Leumit

Final table

Matches

Results by match

State Cup

Netanya 25th Anniversary Cup
In October and November, while the promotion playoffs and the State Cup were being played, two cup competitions were organized by Liga Leumit Clubs, the second edition of the Shapira Cup, and the Netanya 25th Anniversary Cup. Hapoel Ramat Gan, Hapoel Ramat Gan, Hapoel Ramat Gan and Hapoel Ramat Gan took part in the competition, dedicated to the 25th anniversary of Netanya.

Table

References

Hapoel Ramat Gan F.C. seasons
Hapoel Ramat Gan